Panther Mountain is a summit located in Central New York Region of New York located in the Towns of Ohio and Webb in Herkimer County, north of Atwell.

References

Mountains of Herkimer County, New York
Mountains of New York (state)